Lorenzo Salimbeni (San Severino Marche 1374-c1418) and Jacopo Salimbeni (c.1370/80-after 1426) were Italian painters. They were brothers whose work spanned both a relatively narrow geographical area and time period, from the triptych painting of the altarpiece of the Mystical Marriage of St Catherine by Lorenzo alone in 1400 (Pinacoteca Civica, San Severino) to the frescoes of the Crucifixion and Scenes from the Life of St John the Baptist in the Oratory of St John the Baptist, Urbino, in 1416. The majority of their work is to be found in churches in and around their home town, San Severino Marche.

Life

Jacopo served as a Councillor of the Commune in San Severino Marche.

Works

Some works are signed by Lorenzo alone; none are undoubtedly ascribable to Jacopo alone. In spite of their production was limited to few provinces of east-central Italy, their stylistic elements are representative of the internationalization of that pictorial language.

The two painters frescoed the Abbey of San Lorenzo in Doliolo, the Church of San Domenico, and the old Cathedral of Saint Maria della Pieve in San Severino.

Some of their paintings are displayed in the Pinacoteca Civica Padre Pietro Tacchi Venturi in San Severino Marche, including the Mystical Marriage of St Catherine by Lorenzo alone in 1400.

Lorenzo and Jacopo painted frescoes of John the Baptist in Urbino in 1416.

References

External links
Scarpellini, P.: Salimbeni, Lorenzo. Grove Art Online

14th-century Italian painters
Italian male painters
15th-century Italian painters
Gothic painters
People from the Province of Macerata
1374 births
1418 deaths